Verslo žinios (English: Business news) is a leading Lithuanian business newspaper published in Vilnius since 1995 and online since 2001. Swedish Bonnier Business Press group holds a 73% stake in Verslo žinios. The remaining owners are newspaper's founder Rolandas Barysas and investment company "Cicera".

The newspaper is published by UAB "Verslo žinios" which also publishes magazine Verslo klasė, as well as holds conferences, owns a leading Lithuanian business news website VZ.lt, employment website CV.lt and company information database Rekvizitai

Verslo Žinios has organised conferences for 16 years, some of which are "Gazelė", "Password", "Best internet", as well as others. As of February 2023, there are 102 employees working for the newspaper. It has a journalism, telemarketing, advertising, IT and subscriptions divisions.

Editor-in-chief of Verslo žinios is Rolandas Barysas, a Lithuanian journalist and entrepreneur.

References 

Publications established in 1995
Daily newspapers published in Lithuania
1995 establishments in Lithuania
Newspapers published in Vilnius